The Small Isles are a group of uninhabited islands east of Jura, in the council area of Argyll and Bute, Scotland. From south to north, the five islands are Eilean nan Gabhar (Island of the Goats), Eilean nan Coinein (Island of the Rabbits), Eilean Diomhain (Idle Island), Pladda and Eilean Bhride (Bridget's Island). A 19th century sloop called Agnes was wrecked at the Small Isles in December 1858. Its length was 12 meters and beam 4 meters. A 19th century sloop called Thistle was wrecked at the Small Isles in on the 1 February 1864. The crew was saved. Thistle was built in 1827 and its length was 16 meters and beam 5 meters.

References 

Archipelagoes of Scotland
Landforms of the Inner Hebrides
Landforms of Argyll and Bute